Dunstan Anderson (December 31, 1970 – May 31, 2004) was an American professional football defensive lineman in the National Football League (NFL) and the World League of American Football (WLAF). He played for the Atlanta Falcons and Miami Dolphins of the NFL, and the London Monarchs and Rhein Fire of the WLAF. Anderson played collegiately at the University of Tulsa. Anderson was the passenger of an SUV when he was killed in an automobile accident, which also left the driver of the SUV in critical condition.

References

External links
Just Sports Stats

1970 births
2004 deaths
American football defensive ends
Canadian football defensive linemen
Atlanta Falcons players
London Monarchs players
Miami Dolphins players
Rhein Fire players
Grand Rapids Rampage players
Chicago Enforcers players
Carolina Cobras players
Winnipeg Blue Bombers players
Players of American football from Fort Worth, Texas
Road incident deaths in Florida
Tulsa Golden Hurricane football players
African-American players of American football
African-American players of Canadian football